Andrew Knox may refer to:

 Andrew Knox (bishop) (1559–1633), Scottish churchman, Bishop of the Isles and Bishop of Raphoe
 Andrew Knox (Canadian politician) (1866–1946), Irish-born farmer and political figure in Saskatchewan, Canada
 Andrew Knox (1709–1774), Irish MP for county Donegal
 Andrew Knox (1766–1840), Irish MP for Strabane
 Andy Knox (1864–1940), Major League Baseball first baseman